The Queen was a Brass Era American automobile manufactured between 1904 and 1907 in Detroit, Michigan.

History 
Carl H. Blomstrom was an engineer who built his first experimental car in 1897 and a second one in 1899.

Blomstrom (1902-1903) 
Blomstrom became a manufacturer in 1902 of a small single-cylinder runabout.  By the end of 1903 he had built 25 of these Blomstrom cars that would become the basis for the Queen introduced in 1904.

Queen (1904-1907) 
In 1904 the C.H. Blomstrom Motor Company was established and Blomstrom renamed his car the Queen. The Queen began as a runabout with a one-cylinder engine developing an impressive 8-hp.  A double-opposed engine was also available and a four-cylinder was added for 1905 when the one-cylinder was dropped. During the summer of 1906 the firm was in trouble with the authorities, charged with having been “defectively incorporated."

The 1906 Queen was available as a 14-hp and 18-hp twin or as a 28-hp four.  The Model K 4-cylinder was priced at $2,000, .  The two-cylinder models were priced at $800 and $1,100, .

Blomstrom's legal issue was resolved when Car De Luxe negotiated a merger with his firm. The Queen became the Car De Luxe for 1908. Total production of his Queen has been estimated as 1,500 units.

Blomstrom (1907-1908) 
In 1907, after the merger of the Queen, the Blomstrom Manufacturing Company was set-up across town in a new factory. His new Blomstrom 30 was a 4-cylinder with a 110-inch wheelbase. Larger than the previous Queen, it was little changed for 1908 when production was being planned at 200 units. The Blomstrom was described in the press as "the last thing in motor car design throughout”.  In 1908 Carl Blomstrom was developing the Gyroscope car which was nearing production and discontinued the Blomstrom.

Carl H. Blomstrom was responsible for no fewer than five different cars: the Queen, the Gyroscope, the Rex cyclecar, the Frontmobile and the Blomstrom.

See also 
 Queen automobiles at ConceptCarz

References

Defunct motor vehicle manufacturers of the United States
Motor vehicle manufacturers based in Michigan
Defunct manufacturing companies based in Michigan
Vehicle manufacturing companies established in 1902
Vehicle manufacturing companies disestablished in 1907
Veteran vehicles
Brass Era vehicles
1900s cars
Cars introduced in 1902
Cars introduced in 1907